Scaphium can refer to:

Scaphium - a genus of plants
Scaphium (beetle) - a genus of beetles
Part of the Weberian apparatus in fish anatomy